Agua Sal Creek is a stream located in the Chinle Valley of Apache County, Arizona.

"Agua Sal" is a name derived from Spanish meaning "salt water".

References

Rivers of Apache County, Arizona
Rivers of Arizona